Notre Dame High School is a private, all-female, Roman Catholic high school in Salinas, California. It is located in the Roman Catholic Diocese of Monterey.

Background
Notre Dame was originally founded as the all-girls section of Palma School, before being established as a separate school in 1964 by the Diocese of Monterey under the direction of the Sisters of Notre Dame de Namur. 

Notre Dame is located one block away from its sister school, Palma, a Catholic all-boys school.

Notes and references

External links
 School Website
  
 

High schools in Monterey County, California
Catholic secondary schools in California
Education in Salinas, California
Roman Catholic Diocese of Monterey in California
Educational institutions established in 1964
Sisters of Notre Dame de Namur schools
Buildings and structures in Salinas, California
1964 establishments in California
Girls' schools in California